Oraville is an unincorporated community in Jackson County, Illinois, United States. Oraville has a post office with ZIP code 62971.

References

Unincorporated communities in Jackson County, Illinois
Unincorporated communities in Illinois